The men's 67.5 kg weightlifting competitions at the 1960 Summer Olympics in Rome took place on 8 September at the Palazzetto dello Sport. It was the ninth appearance of the lightweight class.

Results

References

Weightlifting at the 1960 Summer Olympics